Limnodriloides major is a species of clitellate oligochaete worm, first found in Belize, on the Caribbean side of Central America.

References

Further reading

Erséus, Christer. "Mangroves and marine oligochaete diversity." Wetlands Ecology and Management 10.3 (2002): 197–202.
Righi, Gilberto, and Elizabeth Kanner. "Marine Oligochaeta (Tubificidae and Enchytraeidae) from the Caribbean Sea." Studies on the Fauna of Curaçao and other Caribbean islands 58.1 (1979): 44–68.

External links
WORMS

Tubificina